"XO Tour Llif3" (stylized as "XO TOUR Llif3" and pronounced "XO Tour Life") is a song by American rapper Lil Uzi Vert from the extended play Luv Is Rage 1.5 (2017) and debut album Luv Is Rage 2 (2017). It was released on SoundCloud on February 26, 2017, and later on all music streaming platforms on March 24, 2017. The track was produced by TM88, with co-production by JW Lucas. It peaked at number seven on the US Billboard Hot 100, becoming Lil Uzi Vert's highest-charting single as a solo artist until the release of "Futsal Shuffle 2020", which peaked at number five. It was also their second top 10 entry overall after their feature on "Bad and Boujee" by Migos. It is Lil Uzi Vert's most popular song, and has amassed over one billion streams on Spotify. On December 7, 2022, the song was certified RIAA Diamond selling over 11 million copies, giving them their first Diamond certification and making it the best-selling emo rap song of all-time. A sequel to the song, titled "P2" was included on Lil Uzi Vert's second album Eternal Atake (2020). The song has since come to be regarded as Lil Uzi Vert's signature song.

It was later featured on the soundtrack for WWE 2K20.

Background
"XO Tour Llif3" began when Lil Uzi Vert started collaborating with producer TM88. Lil Uzi Vert originally contacted TM88 through FaceTime while TM88 was in Miami to work with rappers Future and Gucci Mane. TM88's return flight to Atlanta was delayed due to the Fort Lauderdale airport shooting. During the ten-hour wait at the airport following the shooting, TM88 lost his laptop charger. When TM88 returned to Atlanta, he could not access his laptop, leading to him using an old computer and a Beats Pill speaker to produce the instrumental for "XO Tour Llif3".

On February 26, 2017, Lil Uzi Vert released Luv Is Rage 1.5, an extended play consisting of four tracks, including "XO Tour Llif3", on their SoundCloud account. The song quickly amassed millions of plays and attention across social media, and as a result was given a commercial release. The popularity of "XO Tour Llif3" resulted in the viral "Lil Uzi Vert Challenge".

Composition 
"XO Tour Llif3" is an emo rap song composed in common time ( time) with a length of three minutes two seconds and written in B minor with a tempo of 155 beats per minute with a common chord progression of Gmaj7—Em—Gmaj7—Bm—A. The song is inspired by Lil Uzi Vert's relationship with Brittany Byrd and the couple's eventual break-up in June 2016. The themes of the song focus around substance abuse, quoting Xanax and prescription drug abuse as a way to relieve heartbreak. Lil Uzi Vert references money numerous times on the track with one line stating "all my friends are dead" citing the use of deceased presidents on banknotes.

TM88 produced "XO Tour Llif3" on FL Studio. XO Tour Llif3 was originally a collaboration with another producer, J.W Lucas. TM88 sped up the original beat and chopped the intro and the first verse before using the FL Studio plugin Gross Beat to manipulate the volume and the time of the instrumental.

Critical reception
Pitchfork writer Matthew Strauss stated, "Uzi resists total caricature with [their] liberal use of dark, manic details, and on 'XO TOUR Llif3' [they channel] the indulgence of dulled senses perfected by Future at his DS2 peak." Regarding the production, Strauss claimed, "TM88's slightly psychedelic minor key production, gives Uzi's nonchalance the feeling of a daydream." Jordan Sargent of Spin wrote, "Though the song is an instant hit among Uzi Vert's growing and feverish fanbase—so much so that [their] label fast tracked an animated video that hit YouTube this morning—it also works as a good entry point for anyone who has not yet approached an artist who is poised to become one of the most ubiquitous voices in rap".

Complex and Pigeons & Planes named it the best song of the year, Billboard and Pitchfork considered it the fifth-best song of the year, The New York Timess Jon Caramanica the eighth, Rolling Stone staff considered it the seventeenth, and Entertainment Weekly the twelfth.

Commercial performance
"XO Tour Llif3" entered the Billboard Hot 100 chart issued April 4, 2017 at number 49 and peaked at number 7 in May 2017. Spotify recognized the song as one of the most streamed tracks of the summer of 2017 in the US.

By September 2017, the song had generated 1.3 billion streams across all streaming platforms, generating $4.5 million with Lil Uzi Vert only earning $900,000. Lil Uzi Vert made an estimated $0.00069231 per play.

The song currently sits at over 2 billion streams across streaming platforms.

Music videos
On March 13, 2017, an animated music video for "XO Tour Llif3" was released on Lil Uzi Vert's YouTube channel. The video, which has been quoted as "trippy", was animated by Andrew William Ralph and features a cartoon version of Lil Uzi Vert gripping a steering wheel while holding a lit blunt in between their fingers. It received over 290 million views as of August 2018. The video has been unlisted on YouTube since the release of the official video on September 4, 2017.

On August 4, 2017, the song's official lyric video was released. Directed by Jered Harrison, the video shows an animated version of Uzi riding their motorcycle out of the cargo hold of an airplane and into a purple sky as dollar bills materialize in the air around them before landing in a crowd of fans. The video also became unlisted on YouTube beginning on September 4 but was made public again by December 16, 2017.

On September 4, 2017, the official music video for "XO Tour Llif3" was released; it features XO artists The Weeknd and Nav in cameo appearances. Directed by fashion designer Virgil Abloh, the video was shot in France in the 10th district of Paris. The video became controversial after it was made known that the Arabic subtitles, incorporated into the video stylistically, were merely aesthetic and not an actual translation of the lyrics. An Arabic translator who was previously enlisted among a group to create the original subtitles, later scrapped for unknown reasons, noted the nonsensical content of the subtitles to Abloh, who promptly said that he loved the "'wrong' look". The official video has received over 461 million views as of November 2021.

Sequel
On March 6, 2020, Lil Uzi Vert released a "lyrically reflective" sequel to the song, simply titled "P2", as part of their second studio album, Eternal Atake. The song contains the same drum beat and melodic elements of the original's chorus, with Lil Uzi changing the chorus line to "I don't really care 'cause I'm done".

Charts

Weekly charts

Year-end charts

Certifications

See also
 List of best-selling singles in the United States

References

2017 songs
2017 singles
Atlantic Records singles
Lil Uzi Vert songs
Songs about drugs
Songs about suicide
Songs written by Lil Uzi Vert
Songs written by TM88